Mia Renee Fishel (born April 30, 2001) is an American professional soccer player who plays as a forward for Tigres UANL of Liga MX Femenil.

Fishel spent her collegiate career with the UCLA Bruins, winning two Pac-12 titles before being drafted fifth overall in the 2022 NWSL Draft by Orlando Pride. However, she instead chose to sign with Mexican club Tigres UANL. Internationally, she has represented the United States at under-15, under-17 and under-20 level, winning CONCACAF tournaments with each.

Early life
Born in San Diego, California, Fishel attended Patrick Henry High School and played two years of high school soccer as well as basketball. She was first-team All-CIF in soccer as a sophomore. Fishel played club soccer with ECNL team San Diego Surf SC.

UCLA Bruins
Fishel played three seasons of college soccer for the UCLA Bruins at the University of California, Los Angeles between 2019 and 2021 while majoring in psychology. As a freshman, Fishel appeared in all 24 games and led the Bruins in scoring with 14 goals including five in the postseason as UCLA reached the College Cup semi-finals before losing to Stanford. She ranked third among freshman in the nation in goals scored and earned Pac-12 All-Freshman Team and All-Pac-12 third-team honors. In 2020, Fishel ranked second in goals for the Bruins with six and tied for the team lead with six assists as the Bruins won the Pac-12 title for the first time since 2014. Fishel earned All-Pacific Region first-team and All-American second-team selections by the United Soccer Coaches as well as All-Pac-12 first-team honors. Ahead of her junior year, Fishel announced she would be declaring early for the 2022 NWSL Draft at the end of the season. UCLA went unbeaten on the season, retaining the Pac-12 championship before the team's 26-match unbeaten streak was ended by a 1–0 defeat in an upset to unranked UC Irvine in the first round of the NCAA Tournament having been ranked #3 nationally. Fishel led the team in goals with 12 in her final season and earned her second consecutive United Soccer Coaches All-America honor, being selected to the third-team. She was also first-team All-Pacific Region and All-Pac-12 for the second time.

Club career

Tigres UANL
On December 18, 2021, Fishel was selected in the first round (5th overall) of the 2022 NWSL Draft by Orlando Pride having opted to declare early and forgo her senior year. Her head coach at UCLA, Amanda Cromwell, had been appointed Orlando head coach earlier that month. However, on January 14, 2022, she instead opted to sign outside of the NWSL with Mexican Liga MX team Tigres UANL. Critical of the draft system, she stated she had turned down Orlando because she did not want to be part of a rebuilding team and Tigres offered the chance of championships. She made her debut on January 31 as a 65th minute substitute in a 1–1 draw with Tijuana during the 2022 Clausura. Four days later she made her first start and scored twice in a 4–2 win away to Mazatlán. Fishel scored 17 goals in 17 appearances during the 2022 Apertura, becoming the first foreign player to win the Liga MX Femenil golden boot. She beat fellow American Christina Burkenroad by one goal.

International career

Youth
Fishel has represented the United States at under-15, under-17 and under-20 level. In 2016, Fishel was part of the winning team at the 2016 CONCACAF Girls' U-15 Championship and was individually named player of the tournament having scored seven goals. In 2018, she was part of the squad that won the 2018 CONCACAF Women's U-17 Championship, scoring in a group stage victory over Bermuda and again in the semi-final against Haiti. The result qualified the team for the 2018 FIFA U-17 Women's World Cup where Fishel scored the opening goal in a group stage win over Cameroon, the United States' only win as the team was eliminated as bottom of the group. In 2020, Fishel won her third regional youth title as part of the winning squad at the 2020 CONCACAF Women's U-20 Championship. She scored a new all-ages national-record 13 goals including two in a 4–1 win over Mexico in the final but finished second in the golden boot race by one goal behind Haiti's Melchie Dumornay. She was, however, voted player of the tournament. She was a finalist for U.S. Soccer Young Female Player of the Year 2020 alongside Trinity Rodman and eventual winner Naomi Girma.

Senior
In October 2020, Fishel received her first United States senior call-up by Vlatko Andonovski for a 27-player 11 day training camp in Commerce City, Colorado. The camp was the first in seven months as a result of the COVID-19 pandemic and included four college players with Fishel being the youngest.

Personal life
Fishel's uncles, Andrew and David Bascome, both played international soccer for the Bermuda national team. Andrew's daughter, Druw Bascome, is Fishel's cousin. The two played against each other when the United States met Bermuda at the 2018 CONCACAF Women's U-17 Championship.

Career statistics

College summary

Club summary

Honors
UCLA Bruins
Pac-12 Conference regular season: 2020, 2021

International
CONCACAF Girls' Under-15 Championship: 2016
CONCACAF Women's U-17 Championship: 2018
CONCACAF Women's U-20 Championship: 2020

Individual
CONCACAF Girls' Under-15 Championship Golden Ball: 2016
CONCACAF Women's U-20 Championship Golden Ball: 2020
Liga MX Golden Boot: 2022 Apertura

References

External links
 Mia Fishel at UCLA Bruins
 Mia Fishel at playmakerstats.com
 
 
 

Living people
2001 births
American expatriate sportspeople in Mexico
American expatriate women's soccer players
American women's soccer players
Women's association football forwards
Expatriate women's footballers in Mexico
Tigres UANL (women) footballers
UCLA Bruins women's soccer players
Liga MX Femenil players
Soccer players from San Diego
American people of Bermudian descent
Orlando Pride draft picks
United States women's under-20 international soccer players